= Dematti =

Coordinates: 15°39′N 74°47′E

- Village
- Interactive map of Dematti
- Country: India
- State: Karnataka
- District: Belgaum

Languages
  - Official: Kannada
- Time zone: UTC+5:30 (IST)

Dematti is a village in Belgaum district in the southern state of Karnataka, India.
